Da li ste pametniji od đaka petaka? was a Serbian game show broadcast by Fox televizija. It is a licensed version of the global Are You Smarter Than a 5th Grader? franchise.

The show was aired weekly and it lasted only for one season. The show was hosted by Voja Nedeljković. The top prize was RSD 5,555,555 (around €70,000). Though broadcast on a network seen only in Serbia, and produced in Serbian, the show was actually taped in Sofia, Bulgaria in the same studio as the show's Bulgarian version Това го знае всяко хлапе! that aired on bTV.

References

2007 Serbian television series debuts
Serbian game shows
Are You Smarter than a 5th Grader?
Prva Srpska Televizija original programming